The 1915–16 Tennessee Volunteers basketball team represents the University of Tennessee during the 1915–16 college men's basketball season. The head coach was Zora G. Clevenger coaching the team in his fifth season. The Volunteers team captain was B.J. Greenwood.

Schedule

|-

References

Tennessee Volunteers basketball seasons
Tennessee
Tennessee Volunteers
Tennessee Volunteers